Gyulai Fouball Club is a professional football club based in Dabas, Pest County, Hungary, that competes in the Nemzeti Bajnokság III, the third tier of Hungarian football.

Name changes
 2008–present: Dabas–Gyón Football Club

External links
 Official website of Dabas–Gyón FC
 Profile on Magyar Futball

References

Football clubs in Hungary
Association football clubs established in 2008
2008 establishments in Hungary